Madison County is a county located in the central part of the U.S. state of Kentucky. At the 2020 census, its population was 92,701. Its county seat is Richmond. The county is named for Virginia statesman James Madison, who later became the fourth President of the United States.

The county is part of the Richmond-Berea, KY Micropolitan Statistical Area which is also included in the Lexington–Fayette–Richmond–Frankfort, KY Combined Statistical Area.

Madison County is considered a moist county, meaning that although the county prohibits the sale of alcoholic beverages (and is thus a dry county), it contains a city where retail alcohol sales are allowed. Nevertheless, two of the county's 19 precincts are completely dry. Alcohol can also be sold by the drink in Berea, Richmond, and at Arlington and The Bull golf clubs.

Madison County is home to Eastern Kentucky University, Berea College, and historic Boone Tavern. Famous pioneer Daniel Boone lived in Madison County and built Fort Boonesborough, now a state historic site.

History
Indian trader John Findley, Daniel Boone, and four others first came into the area that is now Madison County in 1769 on a hunting and exploring expedition. In 1774, the Transylvania Company, led by Judge Richard Henderson of North Carolina, purchased   of land west of the Appalachians (including present-day Madison County) from the Cherokee Nation. Daniel Boone was hired to cut a trail through the Cumberland Gap and establish a settlement on the Kentucky River. The settlement at Fort Boonesborough began in April 1775.

In 1785, Madison County was established from a portion of Lincoln County, Virginia.

Geography

Major highways
 Interstate 75
 U.S. 25
 U.S. 421
 KY 52

Adjacent counties
 Fayette County  (north)
 Clark County  (northeast)
 Estill County  (east)
 Jackson County  (southeast)
 Rockcastle County  (south)
 Garrard County  (southwest)
 Jessamine County  (northwest)

Demographics

As of the census of 2000, there were 70,872 people, 27,152 households, and 18,218 families residing in the county. The racial makeup of the county was 93.01% White, 4.44% Black or African American, 0.28% Native American, 0.72% Asian, 0.02% Pacific Islander, 0.34% from other races, and 1.19% from two or more races.  0.97% of the population were Hispanics or Latinos of any race.

There were 27,152 households, out of which 31.50% had children under the age of 18 living with them, 53.10% were married couples living together, 10.70% had a female householder with no husband present, and 32.90% were non-families. 25.20% of all households were made up of individuals, and 7.60% had someone living alone who was 65 years of age or older.  The average household size was 2.42 and the average family size was 2.90.

By age, 21.90% were under 18, 18.80% from 18 to 24, 29.40% from 25 to 44, 20.10% from 45 to 64, and 9.80% 65 or older. The median age was 31 years. Both the relatively large 18-to-24 population and the relatively low median age can be explained by the presence of Eastern Kentucky University, and to a considerably lesser extent Berea College. For every 100 females, there were 93.30 males.  For every 100 females age 18 and over, there were 90.20 males.

The median income for a household in the county was $32,861, and the median income for a family was $41,383. Males had a median income of $31,974 versus $22,487 for females. The per capita income for the county was $16,790.  About 12.00% of families and 16.80% of the population were below the poverty line, including 17.80% of those under age 18 and 17.10% of those age 65 or over.

Elections

Education

Schools
Madison County is served by two school districts:
 Madison County Schools, currently consisting of 10 elementary, 5 middle, and 2 high schools.
 Berea Independent Schools, currently consisting of 1 elementary, 1 middle, and 1 high school.
The county is also served by Model Laboratory School which is part of Eastern Kentucky University.

Colleges and universities
 Eastern Kentucky University, located in Richmond
 Berea College, located in Berea
 National College of Business & Technology, located in Richmond

Communities
 Baldwin
 Berea
 Bighill
 Boonesborough
 Buggytown
 Dreyfus
 Kingston
 Kirksville
 Million
 Moberly
 Richmond (county seat)
 Round Hill
 Ruthton
 Speedwell
 Valley View
 Waco

Economy

Military
The Blue Grass Army Depot is located just south of Richmond.

Notable people
 Frances Estill Beauchamp (1860–1923), temperance activist, social reformer, lecturer
 Daniel S. Bentley (1850–1916), American minister, writer, newspaper founder
 Daniel Boone - American frontiersman and explorer of Kentucky.
 Kit Carson - Christopher Houston Carson (December 24, 1809 – May 23, 1868), better known as Kit Carson, was an American frontiersman.
 Mary Kavanaugh Eagle (1854–1903), American activist, clubwoman, book editor.
 Lonnie Napier (1940–) – former representative for House District 36 in the Kentucky House of Representatives.

See also

 National Register of Historic Places listings in Madison County, Kentucky

References

External links

 Madison County government's website
 Madison County school district's website
 The Kentucky Highlands Project
 List of Madison County historic places on Placeography

 
Kentucky counties
Richmond–Berea micropolitan area
Counties of Appalachia
1785 establishments in Virginia
Populated places established in 1785
Former counties of Virginia